Tok Tok Tok was a German acoustic soul band, active between 1998 and 2013.

History
Before founding Tok Tok Tok in 1998, Tokunbo Akinro (lyrics) and Morten Klein (composition and arrangement), the creative and organizing heart of the band, worked together in various other projects. Their musical search for melodic beauty associated with groove and soul led them to find their completing parts in each other. They played concerts all over the world from Paris, Berlin, Madrid and The Hague to Kyiv, Tel Aviv and Sao Paulo. In 2013, after 15 years of working together, Morten Klein and Tokunbo Akinro decided to have a break and to concentrate on solo projects.

Members
Tokunbo Akinro - vocals.
Morten Klein- tenor saxophone, guitar, drums and mouth percussion.  
Christian Flohr - double and electric bass
Jens Gebel - Fender Rhodes and other keys
Matthias Meusel - drums (2006-2009)

Discography 
 1998: This Can't Be Love (CD)
 1999: 50 Ways to Leave Your Lover (CD)
 2000: Love Again (CD)
 2002: Ruby Soul (CD)
 2003: It Took So Long (CD)
 2005: About... (CD/LP)
 2005: Live In Bratislava (DVD)
 2005: I Wish (Best Off 99/00) (CD/LP)
 2006: From Soul To Soul (CD/LP)
 2007: Reach Out...And Sway Your Booty (live CD)
 2008: She And He (CD)
 2010: Revolution 69 (CD/LP)
 2011: Live & Intimate (live CD)
 2011: Was Heisst Das Denn? (CD/LP)
 2012: Gershwin With Strings (CD)

Awards
 German Jazz Award for "It Took So Long" (2003)
 French Grand Prix SACEM (Singing and Composition) for "About" (2005)
 German Jazz Award for "About" (2005)
 German Jazz Award for "I Wish" best of 99/00 (2005)
 DVD "live in Bratislava" (2005) nominated for "Award Of German Record Industrie"
 German Jazz Award for "From Soul to Soul" (2006)
 Spain "Reach Out and Sway Your Booty" (2007) nominated for the best Live Album 2007
 German Jazz Award for "50 ways to Leave Your Lover" (1999)

External links
 Official website
 Facebook

German musical groups